Félix Dorian Rodríguez (born April 27, 1984) is a Nicaraguan professional midfielder who currently plays for Real Estelí in the Primera División de Nicaragua.

Club career
He started his career at hometown club Bluefields and joined Estelí in 2010.

International career
Rodríguez made his debut for Nicaragua in a September 2010 friendly match against Guatemala and has, as of December 2013, earned a total of 17 caps, scoring 2 goals. He has represented his country in 4 FIFA World Cup qualification matches and played at the 2011 and 2013 Copa Centroamericana.

International goals
Scores and results list Honduras' goal tally first.

References

External links
 

1984 births
Living people
People from Bluefields
Association football midfielders
Nicaraguan men's footballers
Nicaragua international footballers
Real Estelí F.C. players
2011 Copa Centroamericana players
2013 Copa Centroamericana players